Across the Rio Grande is the third studio album by American country music artist Holly Dunn released in 1988.  It did not do quite as well as the preceding Cornerstone. The only hits were the #5 "That's What Your Love Does to Me", and "(It's Always Gonna Be) Someday," which logged in at Billboard Top Country Singles #11. The album itself was at #26 on the Country albums charts.

Track listing

Chart performance

References

Holly Dunn albums
1988 albums
MTM Records albums